Dowlatabad (also Romanized as Dowlatābād) is a village in Aq Kahriz Rural District, Nowbaran District, Saveh County, Markazi Province, Iran. At the 2006 census, its population was 81, in 37 families.

References 

Populated places in Saveh County